Błotnica may refer to the following places in Poland:

 Blotnica (river), in north-west Poland
 Błotnica, Strzelin County in Lower Silesian Voivodeship (south-west Poland)
 Błotnica, Ząbkowice Śląskie County in Lower Silesian Voivodeship (south-west Poland)
 Błotnica, Świętokrzyskie Voivodeship (south-central Poland)
 Błotnica, Greater Poland Voivodeship (west-central Poland)
 Błotnica, Lubusz Voivodeship (west Poland)
 Błotnica, Warmian-Masurian Voivodeship (north Poland)
 Błotnica, West Pomeranian Voivodeship (north-west Poland)
 Błotnica Strzelecka, in south-west Poland
 Stara Błotnica, in east-central Poland
 Gmina Stara Błotnica